Rozina Pátkai (born 1 November 1978, Budapest) is a Hungarian singer, songwriter and visual artist.
She is a vocal artist who has Italian roots and has come to fore with her band playing bossa nova. They have succeeded in many Hungarian and international competitions. She launched her ’Minka’ projects in 2016, with which the all-round artist turns to fine art and to the meeting point of electronic music and poetry. Her husband is Márton Fenyvesi guitarist, composer and producer and has three children: Kamilla, Panna and Rudolf.

Career
After graduating as teacher of Hungarian and English languages in 2009 she enrolled in the jazz singing degree course of Etűd Music School and Conservatory and further on she has taught prosody there. Besides teaching she was on the go as a journalist. She started her career with classical singing. Rozina Pátkai and her band have been playing in different formations in Hungary since 2010. She has been leading her own jazz band since 2011, with which she earned several international awards and national professional credits. Rozina has been working exclusively as a freelancer performer and composer since 2012.

She and the band got the chance to introduce themselves in 2013, at the Jazz Showcase held at the Palace of Arts.

The quintet, which mostly plays bossa nova, is unique because of the authentic expression of Brazilian melodies, the harmony of the vocals and the trumpet, and their special-minded songs. Improvisation, modern musical elements, and the musical shaping of momentary thoughts is put into focus.

The first album of the band received attention even in the United States; first, they received the People's Voice Award for their title track at the Independent Music Awards, and in 2014, they received the jury award.
She launched her music project ’Minka’ in 2016. In ‘Minka songs’, she plants the classical and contemporary poems set to music by her into electronic musical environment. 
Pátkai started her fine arts studies under her first mentor, the sculptor Dezső Mészáros's inspiration, in Théba Art School in 1997. Her first exhibition was held in Budapest in 2001, she documented her trips to London in the pictures. In recent years she makes photos, drawings and artwork, presented under the name ’Minka’. ’Minka drawings’ were displayed in Budapest Jazz Club in 2016, the exhibition was opened by the writer Zsófia Bán. In 2017, her further works were displayed in Debrecen, Noszvaj, Makó and at Night of Artefacts in Art Collectors’ House. She is a student of Intermedia Art programme at Hungarian University of Fine Arts.

Pátkai participated in A Dal 2019 with the song Frida

Awards and honors
 2011 Budapest Festival Fringe, Jury's Award, Hungary
 2011 Edinburgh Festival Fringe, Sell-out Show Laurel
 2012 Jazz Voices 2012, Klaipeda
 2012 EuropaFest Jazz Combo Competition final, Bucharest
 2012 Veszprém Music Festival, Public Prize (Hungary)
 2013 Jazz Showcase, Palace of Arts, Budapest (Hungary)
 2013 Independent Music Awards, People's Voice Award in Jazz Song Category (U.S.)
 2014 Made in New York Jazz Competition, Solo Vocal Top 5 (U.S.)
 2014 Winner, Best Vocal Jazz Song, Independent Music Awards (U.S.)
 2014 Nominee at Independent Music Awards 2014, Jazz Song, Latin Album, Jazz with Vocals category (U.S.)
 2015 Independent Music Awards (U.S.), Best Latin Song
 2018 Independent Music Awards (U.S.), Best Jazz Album with Vocals
 2018 Best jazz album or recording of Hungary, Fonogram nominee - Paraíso na Terra
 2019 Independent Music Awards, Best Album Concept - Taladim

Discography
 2011 Bossa Novas Pátkai Rozina - Tóth Mátyás duo
 2013 Vocé e Eu
 2015 Samba Chuva EP
 2016 Paraíso na Terra (Tom-Tom)
 2018 Taladim

Other works and coproductions
 PECA band, guest vocalist
 Bin-Jip (band), guest vocalist & songwriter

References

Rozina Pátkai on the internet
 Official site
 Jazz lexicon
 

Living people
21st-century Hungarian women singers
Musicians from Budapest
1978 births
Hungarian people of Italian descent